Strevi is a comune and small town in the province of Alessandria, Italy, located immediately northeast of Acqui Terme. It is one of the principal winemaking communes of the Moscato d'Asti, Passito di Moscato, and Brachetto d'Acqui.

References

Cities and towns in Piedmont